The Boy Downstairs is a 2017 American romantic comedy-drama film written and directed by Sophie Brooks, in her feature directorial debut. The film stars Zosia Mamet, Matthew Shear, Deirdre O'Connell, Sarah Ramos and Diana Irvine. The film was released in the United States on February 16, 2018, by FilmRise.

Plot
Aspiring Brooklyn writer Diana and aspiring musician Ben's first date is on a rowboat in Prospect Park, and their relationship becomes serious over a year. Ben wants a long-term, happy marriage like his parents, but Diana plans to move to London and does not want distractions or commitments. She discourages his suggestion of moving with her, and stuns Ben by ending the relationship before leaving.

After returning to Brooklyn three years later, Diana finds an apartment through Meg, a friend of her best friend Gabby. Diana learns that Ben is living in the downstairs apartment, and that he is dating Meg. She spies on Ben and Meg instead of working on her novel, annoying Meg. After Ben and Meg break up, he tells Diana that he does not want to see her as he cannot be only friends with her, and moves out of his apartment.

Ben finds Diana after a minor accident. His devoted care for her at the hospital and at her home reminds Diana of Ben's kindness and character, but when she goes to his new home to confess her love, Meg is there. Her romantic difficulties help Diana finish her novel, however. The film ends with Ben awaiting her at her home, and possibly a tentative resumption of their relationship.

Cast
 Zosia Mamet as Diana
 Matthew Shear as Ben
 Deirdre O'Connell as Amy
 Sarah Ramos as Meg
 Diana Irvine as Gabby
 Arliss Howard as Diana's Father 
 Deborah Offner as Shannon
 David Wohl as Barry
 Jeff Ward as Marcus
 Theo Stockman as Eliot
 Liz Larsen as Diana
 Sabina Friedman-Seitz as Jenny 
 Natalie Hall as Ivy
 Peter Oliver as Julian

Release
The film premiered at the Tribeca Film Festival on April 23, 2017. On June 14, 2017, FilmRise acquired distribution rights to the film. The film was released in the United States on February 16, 2018, by FilmRise.

Critical reception
On review aggregator website Rotten Tomatoes, the film holds an approval rating of 63% based on 43 reviews, and an average rating of 5.7/10. The site's critical consensus reads, "The Boy Downstairs finds a few fresh moments in its familiar setup and benefits from Zosia Mamet's charismatic performance, both of which are enough to keep viewers interested." On Metacritic, the film has a weighted average score of 59 out of 100, based on 11 critics, indicating "mixed or average reviews".

References

External links
 

2017 films
2017 directorial debut films
2017 independent films
2017 romantic comedy-drama films
American independent films
American nonlinear narrative films
American romantic comedy-drama films
Films about writers
Films scored by David Buckley
Films set in New York City
2010s English-language films
2010s American films